Taganka Prison (Russian: Таганская тюрьма) was built in Moscow in 1804 by Alexander I, emperor of Russia. It gained notoriety for its use as a prison for political prisoners, both by the ruling tsars and during the years of the Soviet Union, by the Communist Party. During the Great Purge, the prison housed foreign enemies of the state, such as the German communist, Gustav Sobottka, Jr., as well as Russians. It played host to a mass protest in 1938 when thousands of prisoners repudiated their confessions made under torture.  The prison became immortalized in poems and songs dating from before the October Revolution in 1918. The prison was razed in the 1950s.

Soviet 'martyr' Nikolay Bauman was beaten to death outside of Taganka Prison by a nationalist and reactionary mob upon the release of political prisoners 18 October 1905.

Taganka (song)

Taganka is also the name of one of many Russian prisoners' songs. It takes its name from the prison and was popularized by Russian singers Vladimir Vysotsky and Mikhail Shufutinsky.

Notable prisoners 
 Marcel Pauker
 Seraphim Chichagov
 Pavel Florensky
 Thomas Sgovio

References

External links 

 Taganka - Prison and Songs

Prisons in Russia
Prisons in the Soviet Union
Russian songs
Buildings and structures demolished in the 1950s
Demolished buildings and structures in Moscow